Sinn Féin is an Irish political party.

Sinn Féin may also refer to:
Sinn Féin (slogan), a slogan used by Irish nationalists in the late 19th and early 20th centuries
Sinn Féin the Workers Party, former name of the Workers' Party (Ireland)
Sinn Féin Printing & Publishing Company, a publishing company founded by Arthur Griffith
Sinn Féin (newspaper), a newspaper published by the above
Republican Sinn Féin, a minor political party

See also
History of Sinn Féin